TheSoul Publishing is a global media publisher, based in Cyprus. Founded in 2016, it focuses on light-hearted engageable video content.  TheSoul Publishing’s brands include some of the most-subscribed YouTube channels such as: 5-Minute Crafts, Bright Side 123 GO!, Avocado Couple, La La Life, Slick Slime Sam and Teen-Z. 

Though the company is based in Limassol, Cyprus, its videos are produced all across the world. TheSoul has offices throughout Europe and North America, from which it serves its 1.5 billion social followers.  It develops videos across 100 channel brands in 19 different languages.

Since October 2022, the company has been headed by Arthur Mamedov as CEO. Prior to his promotion to CEO, Mamedov was the company’s COO from 2016-2022.

History 
TheSoul Publishing launched in Limassol, Cyprus in 2016. Founded by Russian developers Pavel Radaev and Marat Mukhametov, it grew out of a company known as AdMe. AdMe was focused on digital advertising and content distribution and based in Kazan, Russia. In the same year as its inception, TheSoul launched its hit channel 5-Minute Crafts. 2017 saw them launch their second most popular channel Bright Side.

In March 2021, TheSoul Publishing was named Digital Studio of the Year by Digiday at its Video & TV Awards. In September 2021 the company published a video launching its virtual YouTuber music artist "Polar", which received over 3 million views by December that year. TheSoul later announced a distribution deal with French record label Believe in December 2021.  

In December 2022, TheSoul Publishing acquired a majority stake in the management firm Underscore Talent.

Partnerships 
In May 2022, TheSoul Publishing announced a partnership with Retail Monster, to develop licensing and retail programs around its flagship franchise, 5-Minute Crafts. TheSoul is continuing its growth in digital content distribution platforms by expanding operations in Riga and installing a studio in the Origo One business centre by the end of 2022. 

In November 2022, TheSoul Publishing launched a partnership with Samsung TV+ which brought 5-Minute Crafts and TeenVee to TV audiences across four European territories: Italy, Sweden, Spain and Benelux. In the same month, TheSoul Publishing partnered with Kidoodle.TV, bringing 5-Minute Crafts, Slick Slime Sam and Baby Zoo to the platform in both English and Spanish languages.

Influence
In 2019, TheSoul said it had 550 employees and produced 1,500 videos a month. In 2021, it was recorded that TheSoul Publishing had 2,100 employees,  80 percent of whom work remotely and follow a 'no meetings' policy. The media publisher has 1 billion subscribers worldwide.  Most of its channels feature "life hacks".

It is the largest media production hub in the world and is the largest company on YouTube and Facebook in terms of social media views, ahead of companies like The Walt Disney Company, Viacom (2005–2019), WarnerMedia and Sony Pictures. The company also has a growing influence on Snapchat, Instagram and TikTok. In November 2021, Variety commented that TheSoul Publishing had the 9th most viewed vertical on YouTube, 5-Minute Crafts Family and the highest performing YouTube Short to date with nearly 433 million views. By June 2022, 5-Minute Crafts had amassed a total of 23 billion views. 

With an increasing appetite for DIY content across social channels, throughout 2021 TheSoul Publishing set out to adapt content from various DIY-focused channels (including 5-Minute Crafts) for distribution on Pinterest. This activity began with creating 5-Minute Crafts in Portuguese (Ideas Incriveis) and Spanish (Ideas en 5 Minutos) and was recognized by The Drum Awards for the Digital Industries 2021, winning the ‘Best use of Pinterest’ award.

Criticism 
In 2018, Vox published an article calling TheSoul's content as being "cringy", "clickbait" and "bizarre", but noted that its output was not overtly political.

Smart Banana was also criticized by Lisa Kaplan in Lawfare for making "history videos with a political tinge". One video positively appraised the leadership of Joseph Stalin, and incorrectly claims that Nikita Khrushchev gave Alaska as a gift to the US; another claimed that the US was the most likely country to fall within a human lifespan. Following the release of Kaplan's article, the claims were picked up by Rachel Maddow, who likened the videos to Russian interference in the 2016 United States elections on her show. However, this has been criticized; Vice magazine could find no new political content on any of TheSoul's channels in the lead-up to the 2020 election, and described it as more of a content mill than a channel to sway public opinion.

In 2019, TheSoul Publishing apologized for having posted "historically questionable" videos, and removed the content, as well as announcing an editorial decision to no longer create historically-focused videos. They stated that they had never worked with "any government or semi-government organization of any country".

On June 8, 2020, TheSoul's animated stories subsidiary channel "Actually Happened" was taken offline, and references to the channel removed from their website. The channel, which had four million subscribers, hosted cartoons of supposedly real events presented as firsthand experiences of American teenagers, but their veracity had been questioned.

References

External links
 Official website

TheSoul Publishing
2016 establishments in Cyprus
Mass media companies established in 2016
Entertainment companies established in 2016
Technology companies established in 2016
Mass media companies of Cyprus
YouTube controversies
Multi-channel networks
Web series producers
Remote companies